"Ruth" is a 1959 Australian television play. It was presented as part of the Shell Presents program and starred Lyndall Barbour. It was written by John Glennon, an American actor and writer who appeared in the production, and directed by Rod Kinnear. The play aired in Melbourne on 5 September 1959 and in Sydney on 19 September 1959.

It was "a saga of older/woman/younger lover."

Plot
Cal, is a lonely man, whose mother did not show him much affection. He is a neighbour to Ruth, a woman with mental problems. Cal's mother and neighbours have attitudes about it.

Cast
Lyndall Barbour as Ruth
John Glennon as Cal
Edward Howell
Jeannie James
Barbara Brandon
Agnes Dobson
Lorna Stirling
Murielle Hearne
Betty Randall
Wyn McAlpin
Wyn Pullman

Production 
John Glennon arrived in Melbourne on 8 August 1959 to present two plays for GTV-9, starting with "Ruth"'. He was also to help coach Australian writers and producers on US drama techniques.

The producers wanted Lydall Barbour to play the lead. She was tracked down to a hotel room in Paris and John Glennon travelled from London to persuade her to accept the part. The play was produced in Melbourne at the GTV 9 studios.

While rehearsing it Glennon said he was working on a play about Australians in London.

Reception
The TV critic from the Sydney Morning Herald called it "a highly original and diverting play" where Glennon's writing was "in an attractively inventive and individual way that sometimes shades into the eccentric". He said "the play's great fault is that its ingredients are too rich for comfortable compression into an hour. It needs more time and space to develop ideas ana incidents too arbitrarily imposed in this production."

The Age TV critic wrote that those viewers "who got the message" would have found the play "interesting. For those who didn't it could have been a bit of a bore."

1962 adaptation 

Another version aired as a BBC Sunday-Night Play in 1962, starring Constance Cummings, again written by John Glennon, and this time directed by Henry Kaplan.

1962 Cast

References

External links
 
 "Ruth" at National Film and Sound Archive

1950s Australian television plays
1959 Australian television episodes
1959 television plays
Shell Presents